Andreas Seppi was the defending champion but chose not to defend his title.

Denis Kudla won the title after defeating Prajnesh Gunneswaran 3–6, 6–3, 6–0 in the final.

Seeds

Draw

Finals

Top half

Bottom half

References

External links
Main draw
Qualifying draw

Cary Challenger - Singles
2020 Singles